Sinan County is a county under the administration of the prefecture-level city of Tongren, in the northeast of Guizhou Province, China.

Area: . Population is 610,000 in 2002.

Postal Code: 565100.

The government is located in Sitang town.

Climate

References

External links
Official website of Sinan County

County-level divisions of Guizhou